Cork North East or North East Cork may refer to:
 North East Cork (UK Parliament constituency), 1885–1922
 Cork North-East (Dáil constituency), 1961–1981